Hugh Salkeld (died 1397 or 1398), of Rosgill, Westmorland, was an English politician.

He was a Member (MP) of the Parliament of England for Westmorland in September 1388, January 1390, November 1390, 1393 and January 1397.

References

Year of birth missing
1390s deaths
English MPs September 1388
People from Westmorland
English MPs January 1390
English MPs November 1390
English MPs 1393
English MPs January 1397